The Flute sonata in D major (HWV 378) was composed (?circa 1707) by George Frideric Handel, for flute and basso continuo. The work is also referred to as HHA iv/18,41.

The work was originally attributed to 'Sr Weisse' (?Johann Sigismund Weiss), but is now considered to have been written by Handel. There is no autograph, but the sonata appears in an important manuscript of 18th century solo sonatas in the Brussels Royal Conservatory, and was published in facsimile in 1979.

A typical performance of the work takes about seven minutes.

Movements
The work consists of four movements:

See also
Handel flute sonatas
List of solo sonatas by George Frideric Handel

References

Flute sonatas by George Frideric Handel